An insurance policy may be canceled before the end of the policy period.  This has the effect of ending the policy coverage on the date of the policy cancellation.

Cancellation methods
Three different calculation methods are commonly used. Cancellation methods are typically calculated using an online wheel calculator.

Pro rata
A non-penalty method of calculating the return premium of a canceled policy.
A return premium factor is calculated by taking the number of days remaining in the policy period divided by the number of total days of the policy. This factor is multiplied by the written premium to arrive with the return premium.

Short Period Rate (old short rate)
A penalty method of calculating the return premium often used when the policy is canceled at the insured's request.  It uses a table of factors that results in penalties that can be lower or higher than short rate (90% pro rata) depending upon the date of cancellation.

Short Period Rate (90% pro rata)
A penalty method where the penalty is 10% of the unearned premium.

Cancellation date
The date a policy's coverage is cancelled prior to the normal expiration date of a policy, often resulting in a return premium owed to the insured.

Inception date
The date an insurance policy's coverage is started.  Also called effective date.

Policy term
The period of time that an insurance policy provides coverage.  Most policies have a one-year term (365 days) but many other policies also have a 6-month term.  Policy terms can be for any length of time and can be for a short period when the period of risk is also short.  Policy terms can also be for a multi-year period.

Return premium
When a policy is canceled before its expiration date a return premium may be owed to the insured.  The return premium is generally calculated using a wheel calculator.  The return premium is calculated by calculating the unearned premium and then subtracting any unpaid premium and penalty for early cancellation.  Short rate (old short rate) and short rate (90% pro rata) are penalty methods of calculating the return premium.

Earned premium
Earned premium is the portion of an insurance written premium which is considered "earned" by the insurer, based on the part of the policy period that the insurance has been in effect, and during which the insurer has been exposed to loss. For instance, if a 365-day policy with a full premium payment at the beginning of the term has been in effect for 120 days, 120/365 of the premium is considered earned. Earned premium will not be returned to the insured if the policy is cancelled.

Unearned premium
Unearned premium is the portion for an insurance written premium which is considered "unearned" by the insurer.  It is the written premium less the earned premium.  The unearned premium would be returned to the insured if the policy is canceled using pro rata cancellation method, when the policy is cancelled with no penalty.

Written premium
This is the premium registered on the books of an insurer or a reinsurer at the time a policy is issued and paid for.

Cancellation cover for travel insurance
Cancellation cover applies if you have booked a trip to take place within the policy period, but you are forced to cancel your travel plans because of one of changes in circumstances, which are beyond your control, and of which you were unaware at the time you booked the trip.

Cancellation cover may vary but some typical examples are listed below.

 Unforeseen illness, injury or death of you, a close relative or any person with whom you have arranged to travel or stay during the trip.
 You abandoning your trip following a delay of more than 12 hours in the departure of your outward flight, sea-crossing or international coach or train journey, forming part of the booked trip’s itinerary, as a result of strike or industrial action (of which you were unaware at the time you booked the trip), adverse weather conditions, or the mechanical breakdown of, or accident of, the aircraft, sea vessel, coach or train.
 You or any person with whom you plan to travel being called up for jury service or being subpoenaed as a witness in a Court of Law (other than in a professional or advisory capacity). If you are made redundant and you qualify for redundancy payment under current legislation. Accidental damage, burglary, flooding or fire affecting your Home, occurring during the trip or within 48 hours before you depart, when a loss relating to your home in excess of a specific monetary amount is involved and your presence is required by the police in connection with such events.
 Your compulsory quarantine.

See also
 Pro rata
 Short rate table
 Wheel calculator

References

Insurance